is a Japanese male volleyball player. He was a part of the Japan men's national volleyball team in 2015 and is registered again in 2022. On club level, he used to play for Toray Arrows and then transferred to Panasonic Panthers.

References

External links
 profile at FIVB.org

1992 births
Living people
Japanese men's volleyball players
Place of birth missing (living people)
20th-century Japanese people
21st-century Japanese people